Tatiana Petrovna Nikolayeva (Tat'jana Petrovna Nikolajeva; May 4, 1924November 22, 1993) was a pianist, composer, and teacher from the Soviet Union.

Life
Nikolayeva was born in Bezhitsa, in the Bryansk district, on May 4, 1924. Her mother was a professional pianist and studied at the Moscow Conservatory under the renowned pedagogue Alexander Goldenweiser, and her father was an amateur violinist and cellist. Nikolayeva won first prize in the International Johann Sebastian Bach Competition in Leipzig, which was founded to mark the bicentenary of Bach's death in 1750. Dmitri Shostakovich, who was a member of the jury, composed and dedicated the 24 Preludes and Fugues, Op. 87, to her: it remained an important part of her piano repertoire.

She sat as a jury member on international competitions such as the Paloma O'Shea Santander International Piano Competition, the International Tchaikovsky Competition and the Leeds Piano Competition. She recorded her own transcription of Sergei Prokofiev's Peter and the Wolf. Nikolayeva was the teacher of Nikolai Lugansky.  Among her other students was András Schiff, whom she taught in summer courses at the Hochschule für Musik Franz Liszt, Weimar.

She died on November 22, 1993 in San Francisco, nine days after succumbing to a brain haemorrhage during a performance of one of the Op. 87 fugues at the Herbst Theatre.

As James Campbell-Methuen commented in her obituary, "Aside from the Shostakovich, though, Tatiana Nikolayeva will be remembered as a Bach player who flung stylistic considerations to the winds and played the music with an irrepressible musical intelligence and knowledge of the resources of her chosen instrument."

Partial repertoire
 Preludes, Op. 34 (Shostakovich)

Compositions
 Violin Concerto (1972)
 Symphony (1955; rev. 1958)
 24 Concert Études, Op. 13 (1951–53)
 Piano Quintet (1947)

References

External links
 website in memoriam of Tatiana Nikolayeva
 Short biography and photograph from Hyperion Records
 Interview with Tatiana Nikolayeva by Bruce Duffie, October 16, 1992

1924 births
1993 deaths
People from Bryansk
People's Artists of the USSR
Stalin Prize winners
Russian classical pianists
Russian women pianists
Women classical pianists
Russian classical composers
Soviet women classical composers
Russian women classical composers
20th-century classical composers
Russian music educators
Piano pedagogues
Moscow Conservatory alumni
20th-century classical pianists
20th-century women composers
20th-century women pianists